Richard Chai is an American fashion designer.

Career 
Chai creates clothes for an eponymous label. Before launching his own line, he designed for Marc by Marc Jacobs, and Cristiano Ronaldo for two labels, for underwear and socks from 2013 and then for shirts from 2014.

In 2008, he released a capsule line under Target's Go International.

Collaborations
Richard Chai partnered with design firm Snarkitecture for a new pop-up retail store underneath the Highline at 504 West 24th Street in Manhattan. The project entitled "Building Fashion" and conceived by BOFFO and Spilios Gianakopoulos aimed to promote collaborations between architecture and fashion. Snarkitecture's installation re-imagined the retail interior as a glacial cavern, hand carved from EPS foam. The store carried Chai's men's and women's collections and was open for 10 days in October 2010.

Awards and nominations
2008 CFDA/Vogue Fashion Fund top 10 finalists
2010 Council of Fashion Designers of America Designer of the Year – Men's Wear

See also
 Korean Americans in New York City

References

External links

Richard Chai bio unofficial

Year of birth missing (living people)
Living people
American fashion designers
Menswear designers